Khaglan Wala (ڪھگلانواله) is a village and union council of Isakhel Tehsil of Mianwali District in the Punjab province of Pakistan. It is part of Isa Khel Tehsil and is located at 32°37'60N 71°16'0E. It is located on the northern bank of Kurram River. It is one of the villages situated on the western borders of Punjab province adjacent to KPK province. Its population is about 3000 people. It is a comparatively developed village as basic facilities like electricity, telephone, metalled road, internet, schools, water supply system and sewerage system are provided to the inhabitants of this village. It is also a well-planned village situated on a 40 feet wide (18' metalled) road. A 30' main street runs east to west through the village by equally dividing the entire village into two parts. Three other streets run north to south crossing the main street at 90°. There are four mosques i.e Grand Mosque (Jamae Masjid or Waddi Maseet), Masjid Naurang Khel,  Masjid Khizar Khel  in Mohalla Khizar Khel and Masjid  Abadi Tajpora in this settlement. The scene of river Kurram alongside bela jungle give beautiful look to this historical village. Khaglanwala is a hub of different routes coming from various villages situated on other side of the River Kurram to reach Isa Khel city.

CPEC Western Rout 
Newly constructed D.I. Khan-Hakla Motorway (CPEC/ M14) passes  through its  western suburbs, touching its outskirts,  after crossing a large bridge on the Kurram River.

Etymology 
The name “Khaglanwala” was given due to the tree “Khagal(کۿگڵ)”[ English: Tamarisk, Punjabi: اوكاں, Urdu: فراش, Pashto/Balochi : غز] which were found there in large number in the past. But, at present, hardly a few old Khagal trees exist in the village.

History 
This Village was founded by the people of Mammun Khel clan of Isa Khel Niazi's when Sheikh Fareed Khan of Mammun Khel family divided land occupied by Isa khel tribe in late 16th century, land was divided into four portions, one portion for Mammun Khel one for Badin Zai one for Zaku Khel and one for Apu Khel with Bambra clan.  
At that time Mammun Khel clan were further divided into four sub-clans Shamsi Khel, Pahar Khel, Ahmed Khel and Khizar Khel. The name Shamsi Khel no more exists as the same had been divided and sub-divided into several Khelis like Saido Khel, Jhangi Khel, Naurang Khel, Sarwar Khel, Hassan Khel, Hakeem Khel, Beram Khel, Ghalay Khel, Wadday, Sher Khani etc.

Present day Khaglan Wala was rehabilitated on the northern side of old Khaglan Wala which was destroyed in 1904 due to erosion by the Kurram River.
It is the center of Ahmad Khel,Khizar khel, Azeem Khel and Naurang Khel branches of Mammun Khel Tribe. The village became a Union Council in 1960s  being a main village located at central point in the area.

Language 
Local people speak Saraiki/Hindko and some understand/speak Pashto, the ancestral language of Niazi  Afghans.

Inhabitants 
Majority of residents of the village are Niazi's and Jats. The notable Niazi sub-tribes are Khizar Khel , Ahmad Khel, Naurang Khel and Azeem Khel. The later hailed from Ghazi Khel clan of Mammun Khel tribe. Hassu Khel and Khushhalay Khel's are clans of Uttar Khel (Jat) tribe. A few houses of Sayyeds, Qureshies,  Kaneras (Weavers), Tarkhans (Carpenters), Lohars (Blacksmiths) and other craftsmen like Mirasies (drummers), Machhis (Fisherman), Mohanas (Sailors/Boatman) and Kumhars (Pot makers) are also present in this village. Some Hindu families also lived in this village during pre-partition time and migrated to India in 1946.

People from this village living in other areas
Many people from this village live in other areas of Pakistan as well as rest of the world. In Pakistan they mainly live in Faisalabad, Rawalpindi/Islamabad, Khanewal, Karachi, Hyderabad, Sukkur & Lahore.

References

Union councils of Mianwali District
Populated places in Mianwali District